Maurice Robert Josse Marie Ghislain, Count Lippens (born 9 May 1943 in Knokke, Belgium) is a Belgian businessman and banker. He is the grandson of Maurice Lippens (1875) and brother of Leopold Lippens, mayor of Knokke-Heist.

Education
Maurice Lippens obtained a doctorate in law from the Universite Libre de Bruxelles (ULB) (Brussels, Belgium) in 1967, and an MBA degree from the Harvard Business School (U.S.) in 1972.

Career
Maurice Lippens started his professional career in South Africa to assist with the reorganisation of the Maatschappij voor Zeevisserij where he stayed for five months, and then served his military service duties in the Belgian army.

After he graduated from Harvard Business School (MBA), he held management positions at Scienta S.A., the Société Européenne de Venture Capital. He then took over a company in Brussels on his own account, which was resold in 1979.

He has been the Chairman of Fortis since 1990, participating to the creation of the group. In 2000, he became Chairman of the Executive Committee of Fortis. In 2004, he became the sole President of the group.

Mr Lippens was relieved of his position after a government bailout of the bank on 28 September 2008. He has been involved in numerous law suits and was accused of calling for private investors to buy more Fortis shares in June 2008.  In 2009, he still owned his shares (920,000 shares) of Fortis. In 2012, a Dutch court cleared Maurice Lippens for the misleading financial information published by Fortis in May–June 2008. In 2018, the Belgian justice dropped charges against seven ex-directors of Fortis, including Maurice Lippens, considering that they could not have foreseen the subprime mortgage crisis.

After leaving Fortis in 2008, he lived off his family's real estate company.

Other positions

 Director Total
 Director GBL (Group Bruxelles Lambert)
 Director Belgacom
 Director Suez-Tractebel
 1983-...: President of Companie Het Zoute
 Director 
 Director Finasucre
 Director Groupe Sucrier
 Member Trilateral Commission
 Member Harvard Business School European Advisory Council
 Member Insead Belgium Council
 Member of the Belgian businessclub Cercle de Lorraine.

Awards 
2004: Grand Officer of the Order of Léopold II

References

1943 births
Living people
Flemish businesspeople
Counts of Belgium
People from Knokke-Heist
Free University of Brussels (1834–1969) alumni
Grand Officers of the Order of Leopold II
Harvard Business School alumni